The Blue Bulls (known for sponsorship reasons as the Vodacom Blue Bulls) is a South African rugby union team that participates in the annual Currie Cup tournament. They are governed by the Blue Bulls Rugby Union and are based at Loftus Versfeld Stadium in Pretoria, Gauteng province.

In 1997 the Northern Transvaal team, representing the Northern Transvaal Rugby Union (NTRU), was renamed, officially taking on their then nickname the Blue Bulls. The NTRU itself became the Blue Bulls Rugby Union and the United Rugby Championship team operated by the union was renamed simply the Bulls.

When Vodacom became the team's major sponsor their name was added. Previously the side was sponsored by ExxonMobil and known as the Mobil Blue Bulls. Their main colour is blue and their emblem a bull's head and horns.

History

Northern Transvaal
The team as it is known today has its beginnings in 1938 when the then Northern Transvaal Rugby Union broke away from the Transvaal Rugby Football Union to gain status as an independent rugby union. The new team was named Northern Transvaal and donned light blue jerseys with a red Barberton Daisy emblem. However, in their very first match, they played in the red and gold hooped jerseys of the Pretoria Combined team that often "locked horns" with teams touring South Africa (red and gold being the colors of Pretoria).

Eight years passed before they first lifted the Currie Cup in 1946, when they defeated the Western Province 11–9 at home at Loftus Versfeld thanks to two dropped goals (one off his left foot) by Springbok flyhalf Hansie Brewis; the score was 8–9 to Province (a drop goal counted 4 points in those days). With time running out Brewis, the first true Northerns legend, received the ball in his own twenty-two. With an enormous kick, he tried to get the ball rolling out in the north-eastern corner, but the ball kept rolling and the Western Province full-back, Con de Kock, carelessly waited for it to roll out. When the ball jumped back in field, De Kock noticed Johnny Lourens storming down at full pace and, realising the danger, kicked hastily at the ball but missed it completely. Lourens scooped it up to score the winning try.

Six members of the 1946 team later became Springboks: Hannes Brewis, Fonnie du Toit, Jorrie Jordaan, Flip Geel, Fiks van der Merwe, Louis Strydom and Daan Retief. Retief initially played on the wing, but later became a Springbok loose forward. It was a great pity that the Springboks did not play sooner after World War II as many players could have achieved national colours had they been given the opportunity. They included centres, Hannes de Villiers and Attie Botha, as well as the lock Doerie van Deventer.

Northern Transvaal next appeared in the Currie Cup final in the 1954 season against Western Province but this time Western Province ran out winners; after being up 11–0 at half time they eventually won the game 11–8. The match was played at Newlands. In 1956 they played  at Kingsmead, the well-known cricket ground in Durban in the final. King's Park rugby stadium had not been built yet. The wind was almost gale force and during this exciting struggle the two fly-halves, Thys van Zyl (Northern Tvl) and the later Springbok Keith Oxlee, kicked a lot. Five minutes before the final whistle flanker, Schalk van Dyk scored a try that allowed Northern Transvaal to win the match 9–8.

1968 saw the start of a golden era for Northern Transvaal rugby. Under the coaching of Buurman van Zyl they played Transvaal in the final, defeating them 16–3 at Loftus Versveld. Many players went on to become Springboks. They were Willem Stapelberg, Alan Menter, Piet Uys, Mof Myburgh, Polla Fourie, Johan Spies, Frik du Preez and Thys Lourens. They defeated Western Province 28–13 in the subsequent season's final. This was the match in which South Africa's player of the century, Frik du Preez, dropped, scored and placed, according to his good friend and teammate, Springbok front ranker, Mof Myburgh.

They faced Griqualand West in the 1970 final, with Griqualand West winning 11-9 thanks to two tries from winger Buddy Swarts. Buurman van Zyl described this as the single most disappointing occasion in his 14 seasons at Northerns. The 1971 team did not lose a single game and was most unlucky to play to a draw against Transvaal in the final, 14-all at Ellis Park in Johannesburg. The controversy which surrounded Transvaal's equalising points - a try by prop Theo Sauerman - once again emphasized the necessity of objective referees for Currie Cup finals. Chris Luther kicked a huge penalty that put the game beyond question in injury time and the fans started to run onto the field. The referee ordered them off and indicated that there was still time left. From the restart, Transvaal got possession and after some good support play scored a try. Jannie van Deventer kicked the conversion and Transvaal got a hand on the Cup. This final marked the end of an era for Frik du Preez who announced his retirement from the game.

In 1973 they defeated the Orange Free State 30–22 in the final. This was followed by the 17–15 win over Transvaal in 1974 in a match in which Northerns centre John Knox had a particularly strong game. This match also started a very successful coach and captain combination. Thys Lourens, playing in his fifth final was captain of the side this day. He was to captain Northerns in a further 3 finals and in total play 8 finals - none of them ever on a losing side. A record to this very day.

In 1975 Northerns travelled to Bloemfontein to play against Free State. 2 hours before kick-off an extraordinary rainstorm flooded the field and the players, despite playing in sunshine for most of the match, were unrecognizable within the first ten minutes after the start. The match was closely contested with the conditions playing a strong equalising hand. In the dying seconds of the game with the score level at 6-all, Northerns centre Christo Wagenaar put in a chip kick that was collected brilliantly by right winger Pierre Spies (father of current Springbok and Bulls eight-man, also Pierre) who scored in the corner. Keith Thorresson added the two extra points to a try that was to become legendary and Northern ran out 12-6 winners. Northern Transvaal defeated the Orange Free State in the 1977 (27-12) and 1978 (13-9) finals as well. 1977 saw the emergence of a young 19-year-old that was to become one of the games greats - Naas Botha. The 1978 final was one that was donned the Free State backs against the Bulls forwards. Northerns ran out victors by scoring two fantastic tries by the backs, one of them by Naas Botha. They were runners-up with Western Province in 1979 after two fantastic drop goals by Naas Botha late in the second half. They won the 1980 final against Province in one of the most one-sided finals of all-time scoring five tries to nil and winning by 30 points, a record! In 1981 they defeated Free State 23–6 at Loftus in what was marked an unsatisfactory final. Returning from New Zealand, Northerns fielded all 10 their Springboks except Theuns Stoffberg. Free State did not field their 4 Springboks hoping that Northerns would not do the same and improve their chances of getting a rare victory. Although not in the same line as 1980, the match was still very one-sided. This marked the end of an era for Northerns, since their highly respected coach, Buurman van Zyl, died early in 1982. Another shock was the loss of Springbok flyhalf Naas Botha to America where he tried out American Football. South African rugby was to see a domination by Western Province for the following 5 seasons.

Despite not being able to achieve any success during this time (except for a Lion Cup final victory over Free State in 1985), they still managed to reach the final on 3 occasions being runners-up to Western Province in the 1982, 1983 and 1985 finals. 1983 also saw the first time they lost a final on home ground.

1987 saw the return of the Cup to Pretoria. Under the coaching of John Williams and captaincy of Naas Botha (returning at the end of 1984 after his stint in America) they defeated Transvaal in the final with a legendary performance by the captain, who scored all 24 points with 4 penalties and 4 drop goals. In the 1988 final they defied all odds by beating Western Province and drew with Province again in 1989 at Newlands. This was the one finals victory that has always eluded the team and to this day The Bulls have never managed to win a final at Newlands against their greatest rivals. They were runners-up to the Sharks in the 1990 final at Loftus but won the cup back in 1991 by defeating Transvaal. Northerns, Province and Free State ended tied second after Transvaal on the 1991 Currie Cup log. Due to points difference, Province and Northerns had to slug it out in a first semi-final on a Tuesday afternoon and managed to do so by winning 34–21. On the Saturday they had to play Free State in the second semi-final and after trailing at one stage 11–0 in the first half and with about 20 minutes to go by 20–9, they managed to turn around the match and run out victors 27-23 - fullback (and old Grey College learner) Gerbrand Grobler being the hero with 6 penalties and a conversion! The following Saturday Northern easily won the final 27–15. They also managed to win the Lion Cup (for a second time) with a record victory of 62–6 over The Sharks.

The rest of the 1990s was a dismal period for Northerns. They lost a lot of players to Transvaal, most notably Uli Schmidt - a legend in his own right and son of former Springbok and Northerns flanker Louis Schmidt (often called the first Blue Bull). Other players included Gavin Johnson, Rudolf Straeuli, Theo van Rensburg, Heinrich Rodgers, Johan Roux, Gerbrand Grobler and Hannes Strydom. The biggest upset came when two Northern Transvaal stalwarts for many years, Ray Mordt and Kitch Christie accepted offers from Transvaal boss Louis Luyt to coach. Christie, after being asked to leave by the Northerns administration halfway through the 1990 season, moulded the players into a great unit and achieved success in 1993 and 1994 at Currie Cup level before becoming Springbok coach to win the World Cup in 1995. Most of the players who followed him would represent his Transvaal side before doing duty at a national level. Without doubt one of the darkest periods in Northern Transvaal's history!

Lion Cup
Northern Transvaal participated in the Lion Cup between 1983 and 1994. The Lion Cup was a domestic rugby union knock-out competition held in South Africa. Northern Transvaal tasted success in the competition on three occasions, winning the competition in 1985, 1990 and 1991. They also finished as runners-up three times in 1987, 1988 and 1989. Northern Transvaal claimed the Lion Cup 62–6 against  in 1991 which is one of the biggest victories ever in a final.

Currie Cup / Central Series
The Northern Transvaal rugby team participated in the Currie Cup / Central Series from 1986 to 1994. The competition saw the top Currie Cup teams play the Currie Cup Central A teams, with the Currie Cup team with the best playing record awarded the Percy Frames Trophy. Northern Transvaal was the most successful team, claiming six consecutive titles between 1987 and 1992.

Super 10
Prior to the professional Super Rugby competition, Northern Transvaal competed in the Super 10, which was a tournament featuring ten teams from Australia, New Zealand, South Africa, Tonga and Western Samoa, which ran from 1993 to 1995. The top three teams from the previous Currie Cup season qualified for each of the Super 10 tournaments.

Northern Transvaal competed in the 1993 season, where they were grouped in Pool B alongside Transvaal, New South Wales, North Harbour and Waikato. Transvaal finished at the top of the pool, with Northern Transvaal finishing third, behind New South Wales. Northern Transvaal did not qualify for the 1994 or 1995 Super 10 seasons.

Northern Transvaal played four fixtures in the 1993 Super 10:
 Northern Transvaal 22–42 Transvaal
 Northern Transvaal 45–20 New South Wales Waratahs
 Northern Transvaal 28–18 Waikato
 Northern Transvaal 14–29 North Harbour

Name Change: Northern Transvaal became Blue Bulls

The team had been known informally as the Blue Bulls since the 1940s and from 8 June 1963 in a newspaper cartoon by Victor Ivanoff had been portrayed as such. Their name officially changed to the Blue Bulls at the end of 1997 season and in 1998 after 6 years of not reaching the final and some very heavy defeats at Currie Cup level, the Bulls, captained by another legend, Joost van der Westhuizen, managed to reach the final for a record 24th time after the come-back of the century in the semi-final against a star-studded Sharks outfit. The Bulls' triumph was nothing short of remarkable. After André Joubert's second try early in the second half, which stretched the Sharks' lead from 10–3 to 17–3, even their coach, Eugene van Wyk, believed that they had no chance. But whatever Bulls captain Van der Westhuizen told his team while Gavin Lawless was setting up for the conversion of Joubert's second try, it made them realise that it was now or never. Suddenly, they started playing with new life and new direction. Franco Smith scored a couple of penalties and then prop Piet Boer dived over for a try. The last 12 minutes with the score on 17-all, were dramatic. First, flanker Nicky van der Walt put the Bulls ahead with a magnificent try following Van der Westhuizen's brilliant opportunistic play and great ball skills. And the last nail went into the Sharks coffin when the Bulls were awarded a penalty try for an early tackle by André Joubert on Grant Esterhuizen in the in-goal area. The following Saturday they defeated Western Province 24–20 at Loftus. With only a few minutes left on the clock, Province must have thought they won it when their Springbok-winger Chester Williams went over in the corner, but referee André Watson ruled the pass from Robbie Fleck forward.

The 1998 side was not a side with great names except maybe for Joost van der Westhuizen and Ruben Kruger (who missed the final with injury), but most certainly the one that has showed the most character and guts in the history of the union. As Kruger described it after the final: "The team's success could be ascribed to the fact that the Light Blue jersey made every player's heart beat faster."

2002 was the start of the Heyneke Meyer and Anton Leonard era. They defeated the Golden Lions 31–7 at Ellis Park thanks mainly to heroics by a 19-year-old Derick Hougaard who scored a try, 2 drop goals and 5 penalties for a record 26 points. The following season they defeated the Sharks 40–19 in the final with most of the team doing duty at the 2003 World Cup. The Blue Bulls then won the 2004 final, defeating the Cheetahs by 42–33. This match saw one of the finest individual tries scored in a final. Ettiene Botha received the ball just inside the Free State half and skipped and dummied his way past a legion of defenders - epitomising the great Mannetjies Roux against the Lions of 1962 - to score a brilliant try next to the posts. A player that surely would have achieved higher honours, he died in a motor car accident the following year.

Free State eventually won the Cup (the first time since 1976) in the following final by beating the Bulls in their own backyard. This was only the third time ever that the Bulls had lost a final at fortress Loftus (1983 and 1990 being the other years). The Blue Bulls shared the 2006 Currie Cup with the Free State Cheetahs with the score remaining locked at 28-all after twenty minutes of extra time.

Northern Transvaal competed in all the years of Super 12 competition but were never very successful. In 1996 they managed to reach the semi-final but suffered a heavy defeat to the Auckland Blues by 48–11. From 1997 to 2002 The Bulls did not reach the final on a single occasion, at times ending last in the competition. 2003 saw them ending fifth and 2004 to 2006 saw them reach the semi-finals for the first time since 1996, but every time away from home. In 2007 they reached the final for the first time and also became the first South African team to win the Super Rugby competition by beating fellow South Africans, The Sharks, in a humdinger final in Durban. Down by 13–19, they kept the ball alive after the final hooter, taking it through various phases which eventually led to a try by Springbok winger Bryan Habana. Derick Hougaard added the conversion and The Bulls won by 20–19. The Blue Bulls have a positive winning record against all the South African domestic sides including their arch rivals, Western Province.

Rivalries
Through the years the rivalry between the Blue Bulls and Western Province has become legendary, and a clash between these two sides is one of the Currie Cup's biggest rivalries. The first time that the two sides met in an actual Currie Cup final was in 1946, which was also Northern Transvaal's first final contest. The match was played at Northern Transvaal's home ground at Loftus Versfeld, and saw the Western Province go down 11 to 9.

After meeting in numerous other finals following 1946, it would not be until the 1982 season, when the Western Province would defeat Northern Transvaal in a Currie Cup final. In the 1980s the two sides met in six Currie Cup finals, with the Western Province winning three of them and one being drawn. One of the most recent Currie Cup seasons when both sides made it to the final was the 1998 season: The Blue Bulls beat the Western Province by four points, 24 to 20, at Loftus Versfeld.

In recent years, the great rivalry between the Blue Bulls and Western Province has faded. It has been many years since the decades that these two teams dominated the Currie Cup competition and new rivalries have come to the foreground. Many Blue Bull fans actually agree that the rivalry has shifted towards Free State, especially after both teams qualified for the Currie Cup final for the third consecutive year in 2006. Statistics have shown that Loftus Versfeld currently experiences more incidents of bad behaviour during Bulls home games against Free State and the Sharks, than during any other games in the season, including those against Western Province.

The team has one of the largest support bases, averaging over 38,000 to Super rugby games and 26,000 in the Currie Cup competition. Most of the Bulls support is concentrated in Pretoria and the Limpopo Province, however the Bulls also have significant support in Johannesburg, Mpumulanga Province, the North West Province and in Aliwal North.

Notable players
Through the years Northern Transvaal/Blue Bulls have produced many great players that captured the imagination of the rugby public.

Lucas Strachan was a brilliant Springbok flanker and one of members of the legendary 1937 Springboks that won a series in New Zealand. He was the first of the truly great Springbok rugby players produced by the Blue Bulls. And after his playing days, he achieved fame as both coach and selector. He will also be remembered for his enthusiastic team talks and witty speeches. Northern honoured him by naming the club rugby trophy in Pretoria after him - teams compete for the Lucas Strachan Shield.

Hannes Brewis was one of the best South African fly-halves of all time and played in 10 tests between 1949 and 1953 and never on the losing side. Brewis who was renowned for his speed and deadly drop goals, was a great playmaker that graced the Light Blue side when they won the Currie Cup in 1946. In his playing career, he was regarded as probably the best fly-half in world rugby, and together with Fonnie du Toit, he formed the legendary halfback pair both at national and international level.

Tom van Vollenhoven the brush-cut wing who appeared on the scene in 1955, was the kind of player who captured the imagination every time he touched the ball. His try for the Light Blues against the Junior Springboks in 1955, when he beat one player after another in spectacular a zigzag run of almost 80 metres, is still lauded as the try of all tries. This got him into the Springbok side against the 1955 British Lions of Robin Thomson and in the second test scored a hat trick of tries. He would probably have been one of the greatest heroes if he had not gone off to play professional rugby league in England so early in his career.

Louis Schmidt played only two tests as Springbok flank, but for the Light Blues this man with the monster moustache, was a true hero who also made his mark as captain. Schmidt, who ran out in 63 games for the Northern Transvaal in the fifties and sixties, is generally regarded "the first Blue Bull". Controversy surrounded his omission from the side after a heavy tackle on Province winger Jannie Engelbrecht resulting in a broken collarbone for the Springbok winger. Schmidt was dropped and never played for the Bulls again.

Frik du Preez is probably the greatest Northerns hero of all heroes. The Springbok lock and flank was not only a dazzling player on the field, but was equally popular off the field. Together with his close friend, Mof Myburgh, both played a total of 109 matches for the Northern Transvaal. Du Preez and Myburgh were inseparable, and Myburgh also proved to be a hero of note. Despite being rather short for a lock, Du Preez's line-out work was practically unequalled and his powerful sprints struck fear in the hearts of his opposition, while he also kicked for posts for the Springboks and Northern Transvaal and put away some magnificent drop goals. How popular he was, even outside Pretoria, is apparent from the fact that he was carried, shoulder high, off the field after his last game at Newlands in Cape Town in a match that Northerns won by 25–14. Frik retired at the end of the 1971 season. Du Preez was nominated by the magazine SA Rugby as the South African player of the century, and was the first South African to be honoured, along with Dr Danie Craven, in the International Hall of Fame in Auckland, New Zealand.

Thys Lourens represented Northern Transvaal in 168 games of which 84 he captained. He played in 8 Currie Cup finals (4 as captain) and was never on a losing side. He was a very resourceful captain and player and highly respected on and off the field. The partnership he established with Brigadier Buurman van Zyl, was the foundation on which the Blue Bulls built their dominance of the Currie Cup scene in the 1970s.

Naas Botha was, without doubt, the most controversial Northerns hero ever, because no-one was ever neutral about him. People either loved him or loved to hate him. Just like his predecessor, Hannes Brewis, Botha was a genius at fly-half and the great points machine. Amongst all true Northerns supporters, he was one of the greatest heroes of all time, however outside Northern Transvaal he was hated, because the supporters of other teams feared him. Botha's popularity was mainly due to his excellence with the boot. He was the greatest match winner SA rugby has ever seen and has a record that speaks for itself. Botha was fetched by Buurman van Zyl from the Tukkies under-20 team, and included him as a 19-year-old in the most successful side of the 1970s. It was also Oom Buurman who chose him as captain of the Blue Bulls in 1980 over many other more senior players like Daan du Plessis, Jan Oberholzster and Louis Moolman. His great claim to fame came on the 1981 tour to New Zealand where he had the local public in canter. He was an absolute genius and his insight into and knowledge of the game and its rules, and his ability to motivate players, made him the ideal player-captain. Botha would probably have rewritten the record books far more often had it not been for apartheid, which robbed him of the opportunity to play regular test rugby. He was both a brilliant kicker and a true strategist. He received the SA Rugby Player of the Year award a record 4 times (1979, 1981, 1985 and 1987).

Uli Schmidt, son of Louis Schmidt, was the prince of hookers and a genius of a player. A medical doctor by profession he was a favourite amongst all Bulls supporters, even when leaving Northerns for arch-enemies Transvaal at the beginning of the 1993 season. Thanks to his fiery performance and expertise he played many times for his province and country and was desperately unlucky to miss out on the 1995 World Cup year due to a neck injury. If he had been able to play test rugby on a regular basis especially during the late 1980s, he would probably have been regarded as one of the world's greatest hookers. Legendary All Black lock, Colin Meads, in fact described Schmidt as the world's best hooker.

Johan Heunis was a true gentleman and probably the best full-back the union had ever produced. Except for the scrum-half, he played and gave outstanding performances in all the backline positions. In 1989, Heunis was nominated as SA Player of the Year. Naas Botha described Heunis as a; " ... ideal team mate in any crisis situation." He was rock solid on defence, very secure under the high-ball and fantastic with ball in hand.

In 1992, a young scrumhalf by the name of Joost van der Westhuizen partnered Naas Botha as the Bulls' halfback combination. Everyone knew he would become something very special, and with time he did. He is one of only a handful of players that have won a World Cup winners medal (1995), and Tri-Nations winners medal (1998) and a Currie Cup winners medals (1998 and 2002). He captained his side in both the Currie Cup finals he played and was later also awarded the captaincy of the Springboks in the 1999 World Cup.

It was not just on the field where Northern Transvaal have there heroes. Off the field heroes are as important as the on-the-field ones.

Professor Fritz Eloff and Brigadier Buurman van Zyl will be remembered as the greatest of all Blue Bulls heroes off the field. Eloff was the chairman of the Northern Transvaal Rugby Union for 26 years, and one of the most acclaimed and respected rugby personalities in South Africa. He was also Deputy Chairman of the South African Rugby Board for 15 years, member of the International Rugby Board for 27 years as well as chairman for a term, and co-chairman of the SA Rugby Football Union (SARFU). During his time at the helm Northern Tranvaal played in 18 finals, winning 11 and drawing 3 times.

Brig. van Zyl remains not only the most successful coach the Blue Bulls have produced to date, but also the most successful Currie Cup coach of all time. He started coaching the Bulls in 1968 and for the following 14 seasons (except 1972 when poor health forced him to take a temporary leave from coaching) he coached Northerns to 12 finals winning 9 times sharing it twice. He lost only once in a final. Springbok and Northern Transvaal lock and later coach, John Williams said, "For him, it was about fitness, motivation and discipline. In his days as coach, Northern Transvaal won many of their matches in the dying minutes of the game."

Williams in his own right a legend was privileged to be able "to drink from the full rugby cup", first as a player and thereafter as coach and administrator. He doesn't know whether his remarkable hat trick is a first for Blue Bull rugby, but he is proud of the fact that, as player, he was on the winning side in Currie Cup rugby three times from 1973 to 1975 and was the Bulls coach when they won the Cup in 1987 and 1988 and shared it with Western Province in 1989. He was part of the Blue Bulls' administration when the team won the cup in 1998.

Another Bulls coaching legend is Heyneke Meyer. Meyer has coached his side to victories in the 2002, 2003 and 2004 finals, and drew in the 2006 final. He became the first South African coach to achieve success at Super Rugby level when the Bulls beat the Sharks in 2007. Meyer coached the Springboks from 2012 to December 2015.

Home Stadium
Loftus Versfeld Stadium in Pretoria, which was first used for sports in 1906, and rugby in 1908, when the site was known as the Eastern Sports Ground. The stadium was later renamed after Mr Robert Loftus Owen Versfeld, the founder of organised sports in Pretoria, and dedicated many years of his life to rugby union. Due to the Bulls exemplary record when playing at home, the stadium is often referred to as "Fortress Loftus" by South Africans. The stadium at its current configuration has a 52,000 all-seater capacity, and is shared with the Bulls. The stadium is expected to receive minor upgrades in the near future as it will be hosting matches at the 2010 FIFA World Cup. It will not be the first time this has happened and since 1948 there have been continuous improvements on the stadium:

1972 - Upper Eastern Pavilion
1974 - Lower Southern Pavilion
1977 - Main Pavilion
1984 - Northern Pavilion
1989 - South just as it is today
1995 - East just as it is today

The Blue Bulls represent the Limpopo province in the Currie Cup, the northernmost province in South Africa, as well as part of the Gauteng province, drawing all their players from these two areas. 

During the 1920s the Pretoria Sub-union had not foreseen the growing need for fields, but in the first part of that decade, the Sub-union, in co-operation with the Municipality, systematically put their existing rugby fields under kikuyu. University and Boys' High followed their example in 1923, so that there were seven grass fields available in that year. The Railway Institute field at Berea Park was similarly grassed in 1924. At the end of 1928 there were ten grass fields in Pretoria.
The Pretoria Sub-union also wished to improve the facilities at the Eastern Sports Ground. In 1923 the City Council commenced the building of a concrete stand which could accommodate 2 000 spectators. At the end of 1928, mainly as a result of the All Blacks tour, the Sub-union could show a record financial gain and used the profits to erect the changing-rooms and toilets they had waited for, for so long.

Current squad

The following players have been included so far in the Blue Bulls squad for the 2023 Currie Cup Premier Division:

Team history and statistics

Records
Blue Bulls records:

Competitions

Currie Cup

Finals

1 Northern Transvaal was renamed to the Blue Bulls.
2 Transvaal was renamed to the Golden Lions.
3 The Orange Free State have since been renamed to the Free State Cheetahs.

Results per opposition
The Blue Bulls full Currie Cup playing record against other teams in the professional era since 1996.

 All this data includes all playoff matches (quarterfinals, semi-finals and finals)
 2000, 2001, 2002, 2005 and 2016 Currie Cup Qualification results included.
 2000 Bankfin Cup results included.
 Correct as of 19 June 2022

Currie Cup Season-by-Season Standings

Third tier of South African Rugby

Bankfin Nite Series seasons 1996 - 1997

Vodacom Cup seasons 1998 - 2015

SuperSport Rugby Challenge 2017 - present

Seasons

Blue Bulls results for each season were as follows:

Results per opposition
The Blue Bulls Vodacom Cup and SuperSport Rugby Challenge results vs different opponents 1998-2019

Added together based on the fact that both competitions serves as the second tier in South African rugby.

 Fixtures as the  included.
 All this data includes all playoff matches (quarterfinals, semi-finals and finals)
 All fixtures added 1998 - 2019
 Updated until round seven of the 2019 Rugby Challenge.

References

External links
 Official website
 New Zealand vs Northern Transvaal at Loftus Versfeld
 Victor Ivanoff: The Russian father of the Blue Bull rugby mascot

 
Rugby clubs established in 1938
Sport in Pretoria
South African rugby union teams
Sport in Limpopo
Blue Bulls Rugby Union